The 1937–38 Georgetown Hoyas men's basketball team represented Georgetown University during the 1937–38 NCAA college basketball season. Fred Mesmer coached it in his seventh and final season as head coach. The team was a member of the Eastern Intercollegiate Conference (EIC) and played its home games at Tech Gymnasium on the campus of McKinley Technical High School in Washington, D.C. The team finished with a record of 7-11 overall, 5-5 in the EIC, and had no postseason play.

Season recap

Senior Harry Bassin was lead forward for the team and averaged 6.8 points per game. In the last game of his collegiate career, the season finale at Yale, he scored a career-high 16 points in Georgetowns overtime loss.

Junior forward Joe Murphy scored 18 points at Madison Square Garden against New York University and led the team in scoring. He finished the season averaging 7.8 points per game.

Senior forward Mike Petrosky was the teams second leading scorer, with only three fewer points for the season than Murphy, and averaged a career-high 7.7 points per game. He was also among the best rebounders, although rebounds were not yet recorded as a game or career statistic.

During conference play, Georgetown finished with a 5-5 record and was the only team to defeat Temple. Temple finished the season at 9-1 in conference play, 23-2 overall, and went on to win the 1938 National Invitation Tournament. Overall, the Hoyas finished with a 7-11 record and had no postseason play.

When Elmer Ripley, who had served as Georgetowns head coach from 1927 to 1929 during Mesmers time as a Georgetown player, expressed interest in returning to Georgetown for a second tour of duty coaching the Hoyas, Mesmer stepped aside at the end of the season to allow Ripley to take over the program the following year. Mesmer had coached Georgetown for seven seasons with an overall record of 53-76, that record partly reflecting the universitys reduced emphasis on sports during his coaching years. Although his teams had gone 36-20 (.643) at home, they had managed only a 17-56 (.233) record on the road, and this had led to only two winning seasons during his tenure. Despite this, he was a popular figure in Georgetown sports throughout his time both as a player and as head coach.

Roster
Sources

Senior guard Tom Nolan would go on to serve as Georgetowns head basketball coach from 1956 to 1960, and as the schools baseball coach until the end of the 1978 season.

Sophomore guard Francis "Reds" Daly was killed in action in the Battle of Iwo Jima on February 22, 1945, during World War II military service.

1937–38 schedule and results
Sources

|-
!colspan=9 style="background:#002147; color:#8D817B;"| Regular Season

References

Georgetown Hoyas men's basketball seasons
Georgetown Hoyas
Georgetown Hoyas men's basketball team
Georgetown Hoyas men's basketball team